Jonathan Baker (June 14, 1923November 26, 1992) was an American football linebacker in the National Football League for the New York Giants.  He played college football at the University of California and was drafted in the seventh round of the 1949 NFL Draft by the Los Angeles Rams.

References

External links
   

1923 births
Players of American football from San Francisco
American football linebackers
California Golden Bears football players
New York Giants players
Eastern Conference Pro Bowl players
1992 deaths